Ultzamaldea is a comarca in Navarre, Spain.

Municipalities
The comarca consists of nine municipalities, with the largest being the municipalities of Ezcabarte and Ultzama. They are listed below with their populations at recent censuses, together with the most recent official estimate:

References 

Comarcas of Navarre